Sarcohyla hapsa, the northern streamside tree frog, is a frog in the family Hylidae, endemic to Mexico.

Range and habitat
Scientists have seen it between 1,280 and 2,550 meters above sea level in the southern Sierra Madre Occidental from Durango to Nayarit states, the Trans-Mexican Volcanic Belt of Michoacán, Morelos, Guerrero, and Mexico states, and the northern Sierra Madre del Sur of Jalisco and Michoacán states.

This species is found along mountain streams in humid montane pine-oak, pine, and pine-fir forests, where it dwells in streamside vegetation.

First paper

References

Frogs of North America
Endemic amphibians of Mexico
Fauna of the Sierra Madre Occidental
Fauna of the Sierra Madre del Sur
Fauna of the Trans-Mexican Volcanic Belt
Amphibians described in 2018
hapsa